Saywa Punta (Quechua saywa  boundary stone, landmark, punta peak, ridge; first, before, in front of, Hispanicized spelling Sayhua Punta)  is a mountain in the Wansu mountain range in the Andes of Peru, about  high. It lies in the Apurímac Region, Antabamba Province, Antabamba District. Saywa Punta is situated southwest of Hatun Qillqa.

References 

Mountains of Peru
Mountains of Apurímac Region